Antti Tyrväinen (born April 3, 1989), is a Finnish professional ice hockey forward. He currently plays for the Fischtown Pinguins of the Deutsche Eishockey Liga (DEL).

On June 15, 2011, it was announced that the Edmonton Oilers had signed Tyrvainen as an undrafted free agent, to a two-year entry-level contract, and he played two season with the Oklahoma City Barons of the American Hockey League (AHL). He previously played for Tampereen Ilves of the SM-liiga.

Antti's brother Juhani Tyrväinen also plays professionally with Luleå HF of the SHL.

References

External links

1989 births
Living people
Färjestad BK players
Finnish ice hockey forwards
Fischtown Pinguins players
HIFK (ice hockey) players
Ilves players
Jokerit players
Lahti Pelicans players
Oklahoma City Barons players
People from Seinäjoki
Sportspeople from South Ostrobothnia